Al Avila (born August 2, 1958) is a Cuban baseball executive. He was the  executive vice president of baseball operations and general manager of the Detroit Tigers of Major League Baseball (MLB).

Early life
Avila was born in Cuba. His family defected from Cuba to the United States when he was a child.

Career

St. Thomas University
Avila was the assistant baseball coach to Paul Mainieri at St. Thomas University, his alma mater, in 1988. The following season he was promoted to coach when Mainieri left for the Air Force Academy. Avila remained in that position, and also served as the school's athletics director, until he joined the expansion Florida Marlins' front office in 1992.

Florida Marlins
In June 1992, Avila joined the Florida Marlins as the assistant director of Latin American operations. After two seasons with the Marlins, he was promoted to director of Latin American operations. Under Avila's guidance, the Marlins signed 1997 NLCS and World Series MVP Liván Hernández, during Florida's World Series run.

Avila was named director of scouting for the Marlins in July 1998, where he was responsible for all of the Marlins scouting efforts on both the national and international levels and he oversaw the development of those players in the baseball academies in the Dominican Republic and Venezuela. Avila helped sign 16-year-old Miguel Cabrera in 1999, who debuted in the major leagues in 2003 and hit four home runs during Florida's second World Series run.

Avila served as the interim general manager for the Marlins during the 2001 off-season following Dave Dombrowski's departure to the Detroit Tigers. He was named the Marlins vice president and assistant general manager in July 2001.

Pittsburgh Pirates
On January 23, 2002, Avila was hired as a special assistant to Pittsburgh Pirates general manager Dave Littlefield.

Detroit Tigers
On April 15, 2002, Avila was named the assistant general manager and vice president of the Detroit Tigers.

On August 4, 2015, Avila was promoted to general manager and executive vice president of baseball operations, after Dombrowski was released by the Tigers. Avila became the first Cuban-born general manager in baseball history. On July 5, 2019, the Tigers announced they signed Avila to a multi-year contract extension.

On August 10, 2022, the Tigers fired Avila. At the time of his firing, Avila was the only general manager of Latin American descent in Major League Baseball.

Personal
His father, Ralph Avila, was the vice president of the Los Angeles Dodgers, and is currently the senior scouting advisor for the Dodgers. His son, Alex Avila, was a catcher for various teams the major leagues and is now an analyst for MLB Network.

References

External links

1958 births
Living people
Detroit Tigers executives
Major League Baseball general managers
Miami Marlins scouts
People from Havana
St. Thomas University (Florida) alumni
St. Thomas Bobcats baseball coaches
St. Thomas Bobcats athletic directors